Éric Dumont may refer to:
 Éric Dumont (sailor), French yachtsman
 Éric Dumont-Baltet, French horticulturalist and nursery gardener